Meaghan Rath (born June 18, 1986) is a Canadian film and television actress. She is known for her television roles on Being Human, 15/Love, The Assistants, and Hawaii Five-0.

Personal life 
Rath was born in Montreal, Quebec, Canada. Her mother is of Indian Goan heritage. Her father is of English and Austrian-Jewish descent. She has a younger brother, Jesse Rath, who is also an actor.  She studied Cinema and Communications at Dawson College.

On May 16, 2020, Rath married English actor Jack Cutmore-Scott at their Hollywood Hills home. She announced her pregnancy with their child on July 6, 2021. She gave birth to a son at the end of summer that year.

Filmography

Film

Television

Awards and nominations

References

External links

21st-century Canadian actresses
Actresses from Montreal
Anglophone Quebec people
Canadian people of Austrian-Jewish descent
Canadian people of British descent
Canadian actresses of Indian descent
Canadian people of Goan descent
Canadian child actresses
Canadian film actresses
Canadian television actresses
Dawson College alumni
Jewish Canadian actresses
Living people
1986 births